Martha Myers (May 23, 1925 – May 24, 2022) was an American dance educator. She was the founder of the dance department at Connecticut College and a former dean of the school of the American Dance Festival.

References

1925 births
2022 deaths
Dance teachers
Connecticut College faculty
Women deans (academic)